Halcro is a district in Saskatchewan, Canada. Halcro may also refer to:

 Halcro, Orkney, Scotland
 Halcro and Pakashan, an Indian reserve in Alberta, Canada
 Andrew Halcro (born 1964), American politician
 Jamie Halcro Johnston, British politician

See also
 Halcrow (disambiguation)